Vladimir Nikolaevich Retunsky (born February 4, 1950), known as The Povorino Maniac, is a Soviet-Russian serial killer who killed 8 women between 1990 and 1996. He was also suspected of committing four additional murders, which could not be proven.

Biography 
Retunsky was born on February 4, 1950, in the town of Povorino, Voronezh Oblast, RSFSR. Before he got married and had a son, he was tried for rape and causing death by negligence. Prior to his arrest, he worked as a driver for the VAZ company in his hometown.

Retunsky picked up every victim at the roadside, thereby luring them in his trap: from the passenger's side, the truck lacked an internal door handle. Then Retunsky threatened and raped these women, eventually killing them. It was also reported that the killer mutilated bodies of several victims, cutting off body parts and taking them away. The murders lasted until 1996, when Retunsky was arrested due to a combination of circumstances. Having raped and killed another victim, he took her rottweiler puppy home, and when the dog was seen near his house, Retunsky was detained. During the search, a collection of pornographic films and several notebooks of poems about the love towards his "work" were found in the house. In total, the investigation established eight murders, although Retunsky himself admitted to only two.

He had to be guarded heavily to avoid any lynching attempt from his fellow countrymen, and the trial was held in a closed court. The Voronezh Regional Court then sentenced Retunsky to death, but after appealing it, it was commuted to 15 years imprisonment, since at the time there were no life sentences. He served his sentence in the Vladimir Central Prison.

In 2012, after serving the 15-years sentence, Retunsky returned to his hometown and settled in with his sister. He was on the police account, being forbidden to leave the house from 10 PM to 6 AM or visit entertainment institutions. Under the assurances of the management of the Investigative Committee for the Voronezh Oblast, relatives of Retunsky's victims were taken under state protection.

Later in the spring of 2012, Vladimir Retunsky was again detained by law enforcement agencies on charges of stealing 1,500 rubles. The Povorino District Court sentenced him to 5 years imprisonment.

He was released from the Semiluki strict regime penal colony on July 22, 2015.

See also
 List of Russian serial killers
 List of serial killers by number of victims

References

External links 
 "Say and show" - "The maniac is free"

1950 births
Living people
Male serial killers
People from Povorinsky District
Prisoners sentenced to death by Russia
Russian rapists
Russian serial killers
Soviet rapists
Soviet serial killers
Thieves
Violence against women in Russia